Yelena Grigoryevna Drapeko (born 29 October 1948) is a Soviet and Russian theatre and film actress. She has appeared in more than 30 films and television shows since 1972. She is also a member of the State Duma since 2000.

On 29 November 2022, during the 2022 Russian invasion of Ukraine, she claimed that Ukraine as a separate country doesn't exist, that Ukraine is Russian, that the Ukrainian people would benefit from a Russian takeover, and that it was surprising that the Western countries were assisting Ukraine against the Russian attack.

Sanctions
In December 2022 the EU sanctioned Yelena Drapeko in relation to the 2022 Russian invasion of Ukraine.

Selected filmography
 1972 The Dawns Here Are Quiet as Lisa Brichkina
 1973 Eternal Call as Vera Inyutina
 1973 Failure of Engineer Garin as duty at the hotel
 1975 Between Day and Night as Zinaida
 1983 Offered for Singles as Nina

Honours and awards
 Lenin Komsomol Prize (1979)
 Honored Artist of the RSFSR (1980)
 Medal "In Commemoration of the 850th Anniversary of Moscow" (1997)
 Medal "In Commemoration of the 300th Anniversary of Saint Petersburg" (2003)
 Order of Friendship (2013)
 Order of Honour (2018)

References

External links

1948 births
Living people
20th-century Russian actresses
21st-century Russian actresses
21st-century Russian women politicians
People from Oral, Kazakhstan
Third convocation members of the State Duma (Russian Federation)
Fourth convocation members of the State Duma (Russian Federation)
Fifth convocation members of the State Duma (Russian Federation)
Sixth convocation members of the State Duma (Russian Federation)
Seventh convocation members of the State Duma (Russian Federation)
Eighth convocation members of the State Duma (Russian Federation)

Honored Artists of the RSFSR
Recipients of the Lenin Komsomol Prize
Recipients of the Order of Honour (Russia)
A Just Russia politicians
Russian people of Ukrainian descent
Russian actor-politicians
Russian film actresses
Soviet film actresses